MCID (initialism for "My Crew Is Dope") is the third studio album by American rock band Highly Suspect, released on November 1, 2019. Loudwire named it one of the 50 best rock albums of 2019.

History
On August 16, 2019, Highly Suspect announced their third album, along with the release of two singles, "16" and "Upperdrugs"; the former track reached No. 1 on Billboards Mainstream Rock chart.

On October 4, a third single "Tokyo Ghoul" featuring Young Thug was released.

On October 25, a fourth single "Canals" was released.

On February 25, 2020, "These Days" was released as the fifth single from the album.

Track listing

Charts

References

2019 albums
Highly Suspect albums